Nahuel and the Magic Book is a 2020 Chilean-Brazilian animated fantasy-adventure coming-of-age film produced by Carburadores, co-produced by Chilean Punkrobot Studios and Brazilian Levante Films and directed by Germán Acuña Delgadillo. This is the first animated feature that was made in Chile in collaboration with Brazil and this is the first Chilean-Brazilian 2D animated film that entered the Annecy International Animation Film Festival in Annecy, France on June 15, 2020 and in Chile on January 20, 2022.

Premise 
Nahuel resides in a fishing town with his father, but he is plagued by a profound fear of the sea. However, his life takes a magical turn when he discovers a book with mystical powers that may hold the key to his fear. Unfortunately, a malevolent wizard also desires the book and subsequently kidnaps Nahuel's father. Thus, Nahuel embarks on a fantastic adventure to rescue his father while also confronting and overcoming his deepest fears.

Cast 

 Consuelo Pizarro as Nahuel, the curious, introverted, and shy 12-year-old protagonist who is bullied by Calfunao and Rorro. Nahuel is deeply afraid of the sea, and he steals the Levisterio, a magical book, to confront and overcome his fears. However, his actions lead to his father being kidnapped by Kalku, and Nahuel must embark on a quest to rescue his father and conquer his own fears.
 Muriel Benavides as Fresia, a young Mapuchean machi who shelters and helps Nahuel to find his father and possibly his love interest.
 Marcelo Liapiz as Kalku, the main antagonist of the film a sorcerer who controls all crows and kidnapped Nahuel's father..
Jorge Lillo as Antonio, he's Nahuel's dad who's a fisherman and suffered emotionally after his wife's died at the beginning of the film. And he got kidnapped by Kalku after a storm destroy their ship.
Chon Chon, the goblin-like dealer from the Tavern who makes a deal with Nahuel with a riddle.
Guardián, an old sorcerer who lives in the abandoned house.
Rorro, Nahuel's other bully and the friend of Calfunao.
and Don Simón, the man who buys the egg at the market.
 Sandro Larenas as Elzaino, the tavern owner.
 Sebastián Dupont Gallardo as Ruende, a talking wolf who wanted revenge on Kalku. He was also voiced as:
Calfunao, Nahuel's bully.
 Vanesa Silva as   Consuelo, Nahuel's late mom and wife of Elzaino who dies at the beginning of the film and minutes later when Nahuel was about to drown, she saves him and encourage him to be brave.
Raiquen, Ruende's wife who got cursed by Kalku
Huenchur, one of the Mapuche recoverers that save Nahuel
Sra Hilda, the old woman at the marketplace.
 Sergio Schmied as Trauco, an old creature who needs Nahuel's help to find Kalku.

Production 
The film production starts back in 2015 with the help of the Brazilian animation studio Levante Filmes and the other Chilean animation studios later on for the next few years like Punkrobot Studio, which they created and produced the Oscar award-winning short film Bear Story, Red Animation Studios, Dragao Animation Studios, LMS Animation Studios and Draftoons Studios

The CEOs of Punkrobot and Levante Films, Patricio Escala and Sabrina Bogado, manage to help Acuña and his team to make the film as soon as possible due to their fundings.

The co-founder of Carburadores and the executive director from Levante Films, Sebastian Ruz and Livia Pagano, were the producers of the film to hiring animators, sound producers, editors, financers, and sales agents.

The writer of the script in the film were Germán Acuña and Juan Pablo Sepúlveda who they wrote together after his research back in 2012, when he was on the island of Chiloé.

The music composers were Acuña, Felicia Morales, and Christopher Carvajal and the sound designers like Marcelo Vidal and Leonardo Guimaraes use the software device called Alcateia Digital to create sounds for the scenes, Marcelo Jara would be the editor of the film.

The animation director was Enrique Ocampo and the general animation supervisor was Rosamari Martínez, to help the crew of animators across the studios. The art director of the film is also Director Acuña and Coni Adonis, The background artists such as Acuña, Coni Adonis, Javier Navarro, Francisco Vasquez, Luna Vargas and Luisa Adonis, the character design Cristobal Macaya makes the film cartoonish.

The animators of the movie were credited from the other animation studios from Chile, Brazil and Peru like Punkrobot, Levante, Red, Dragao, LMS, Draftoons and many freelance animators all over Latin America.

Release 
Nahuel and the Magic Book had its first premiere virtually in Annecy International Animation Film Festival from June 15 to June 30, 2020, in Annecy, France, followed by other festivals like: The SCHLINGEL International Film Festival in Chemnitz, Germany on October 10–17, 2020, The Chilemonos Festival in Santiago, Chile on October 5–24, 2020, American Film Market in Santa Monica, California, USA on November 9–12, 2020, and The Tokyo Anime Award Festival would premiere this film in Tokyo, Japan on March 12–15, 2021 followed by the North American release in The New York International Children's Film Festival in New York City, New York, United States of America on March 6, The Toronto Animation Arts Festival International in Toronto on March 25, The Buenos Aires International Independent Film Festival in Buenos Aires, Argentina on March 28, The Seattle International Film Festival in Seattle, Oregon, USA on April 8, Stockholm Film Festival in Stockholm, Sweden on April 19, The Premios Quirino in La Laguna, Spain on May 27–29, 2021, The Marché du Film in Cannes, France from July 6–15, 2021, The Transylvania International Film Festival in Cluj-Napoca, Transylvania Romania on July 25–26, Cinemagic in Dublin, Ireland from July 30-August 12, 2021, Zlin Film Festival in Zlin, Czech Republic on September 9–15, 2021, The Viborg Animation Festival in Viborg, Denmark on September 27, 2021 – October 3, 2021, The Cinemarteket on October 7 to 10 2021 on Denmark, The Latin America Film Festival in Los Angeles on October 8–10, 2021, The Animation Is Film Festival on October 23 also release in Los Angeles, The Rolan International Film Festival on Rolan, Armenia on November 1–5, 2021 and the Film Frasnor in Oslo, Norway on November 11–21, 2021.

The film made its US premiere at the NYICFF on March 5, 2021.

In June, "Nahuel" sold to HBO in Eastern Europe, according to Variety.

The film's worldwide release date was expected to be on late 2021 and it would premiere on Chile, Brazil, Peru, Argentina, Colombia, and the United States.

On December 1, El Mercurio reported the official release date on the film in Chile was January 20, 2022 and months later, on September 23, Disney Plus Latin America acquired the rights to distribute the film all across Latin America.

Accolades

See also
 Bear Story

References

External links
 

Animated feature films
2020 films
2020 animated films
2020s children's adventure films
2020s Spanish-language films
Chilean animated films
Brazilian animated films
Animated adventure films
Animated fantasy films
Animated drama films
Animated coming-of-age films
Films about father–son relationships
Films set in Chile
Anime-influenced Western animation
Films set on islands
Films set in forests
Animated films about revenge
Films about magic
Films about fear
Films about curses
Films about witchcraft
Animated films about friendship
Animated buddy films
Films postponed due to the COVID-19 pandemic
2020s Chilean films
Chilean adventure films
Chilean fantasy films